Peter Joseph "Piet" Engels (25 September 1923 – 13 April 1994) was a Dutch politician of the defunct Catholic People's Party (KVP) now merged into the Christian Democratic Appeal (CDA).

Career
Piet Engels opened the Lindenberg Nijmegen Culture House in 1972. Initially there were free academies a music school and a Public Library.

Decorations

References

External links

Official
  P.J. (Piet) Engels Parlement & Politiek

 

1923 births
1994 deaths
Catholic People's Party politicians
Dutch nonprofit directors
Dutch Roman Catholics
Knights of the Order of the Netherlands Lion
Members of the House of Representatives (Netherlands)
Ministers of Social Work of the Netherlands
Ministers of Sport of the Netherlands
Municipal councillors of Leeuwarden
People from Landgraaf
People from Leeuwarden
20th-century Dutch politicians